Postupice is a municipality and village in Benešov District in the Central Bohemian Region of the Czech Republic. It has about 1,400 inhabitants.

Administrative parts
Villages and hamlets of Buchov, Čelivo, Dobříčkov, Holčovice, Jemniště, Lhota Veselka, Lísek, Milovanice, Miroslav, Mokliny, Nová Ves, Pozov, Roubíčkova Lhota, Sušice and Vrbětín are administrative parts of Postupice.

Geography
The large municipal territory lies mostly in the Benešov Uplands, the southeastern part extends into the Vlašim Uplands.

The territory is rich on fish ponds, fed by Chotýšanka and other small watercourses.

History
The first written mention of Postupice is in a deed of Ottokar I of Bohemia from 1205, where he confirmed the ownership of the village by the Ostrov Monastery.

Sights

The village of Jemniště is known for the Jemniště Castle. It is a Baroque residence built by František Maxmilián Kaňka in 1724–1725 for Count Frances Adam of Trauttmansdorff. At the turn of the 18th and 19th centuries, the French-style garden was remodelled into an English-style park. In 1868, the residence was bought by the Sternberg family. It was returned to their ownership in 1995. Part of the castle is open to the public and offers sightseeing tours.

Notable people
Svatopluk Čech (1846–1908), writer; attended local school
Miroslav Januš (born 1972), sport shooter

References

External links

Villages in Benešov District